Fabulous may refer to:

Fabulous (band), a 1990s British rock band
Fabulous (album), by Sheena Easton, 2000
Fabulous, an album by the Tamperer featuring Maya, 1999
"Fabulous" (Charlie Gracie song), 1957
"Fabulous" (Jaheim song), 2002
"Fabulous" (High School Musical song), from the film High School Musical 2, 2007
"Fabulous (Lover, Love Me)", a song by Amanda Lear, 1979
Fabulous (film), a 2019 Canadian comedy-drama film

See also
Fabolous (born 1977), hip hop artist
Fable